Fronting may refer to:

 Fronting (sound change), pronunciation of a sound further forward in the mouth
 Acting as the most prominent member of a group, as in the case of a lead singer
 Movement of a grammatical component to the start of a clause; see:
wh-fronting

 Domain fronting, a censorship circumvention technique
 Fronting, a form of insurance fraud

See also
"Frontin'", a 2003 song by Pharrell Williams
Front (disambiguation)